In education, Response to Intervention (commonly abbreviated RTI or RtI) is an approach to academic intervention used to provide early, systematic, and appropriately intensive assistance to children who are at risk for or already underperforming as compared to appropriate grade- or age-level standards. RTI seeks to promote academic success  through universal screening, early intervention, frequent progress monitoring, and increasingly intensive research-based instruction or interventions for children who continue to have difficulty. RTI is a multileveled approach for aiding students that is adjusted and modified as needed if they are failing.

In terms of identifying students with specific learning disabilities (SLD), RTI was proposed as an alternative to the ability–achievement discrepancy model, which requires children to exhibit a significant discrepancy between their ability (often measured by IQ testing) and academic achievement (as measured by their grades and standardized testing). Methods to identify students with SLD have been controversial for decades and proponents of RTI claim that the process brings more clarity to the Specific Learning Disability (SLD) category of the Individuals with Disabilities Education Improvement Act (IDEA 2004), while opponents claim that RTI simply identifies low achieving students rather than students with learning disabilities.

Description
RTI is originally a special education term that has broadened into general education framework that involves research-based instruction and interventions, regular monitoring of student progress, and the subsequent use of these data over time to make a variety of educational decisions, including, but not limited to SLD eligibility. To facilitate this broadened conception of RTI, there was a shift to labeling this as one of the approaches of a Multi-Tier System of Supports (MTSS) occurring in schools and the professional literature. The key to the RTI process is the application of scientifically based interventions that have been demonstrated to work in randomized controlled trials. A goal of the RTI process is to apply accountability to educational program by focusing on programs that work rather than programs that simply look, sound, or feel good.

RTI follows a number of core assumptions: 
The educational system can effectively teach all children
Early intervention is critical to preventing problems from getting out of control
The implementation of a multi-tiered service delivery model is necessary
A problem solving model should be used to make decisions between tiers
Research based interventions should be implemented to the extent possible
Progress monitoring must be implemented to inform instruction
Data should drive decision making

A learning disability is defined as a neurological disorder that affects the brain's ability to receive, process, store, and respond to information. They are a group of disorders that can impact many areas of learning, including reading, writing, spelling, math, listening, and oral expression.

In the process of identifying learning disabilities, RTI differs from the formerly standard "ability–achievement discrepancy" approach in that decisions are based on outcomes of targeted interventions rather than mathematical discrepancies between scores achieved on standardized assessments.

In the RTI process, service delivery is divided into three tiers (i.e., levels) of support, with the intensity of interventions increasing with each level. Tier 1 is focused specifically within the core curriculum, with instruction and interventions targeting all students. Approximately 80% to 85% of the general student body should be able to meet grade level norms without additional assistance beyond the first tier. Students who consistently do not perform within the expected level of performance through Tier 1 instruction are then provided with additional supplementary interventions at Tier 2, which typically involves small group instruction. Approximately 3% to 6% of students will continue to have difficulties after Tier 2 interventions; these students will then receive Tier 3 intervention services, which is the most intense level of intervention (often one-on-one) provided in the regular education environment. Through RTI, educators can get enough evidence-based data to eliminate the possibility that the poor of academic performance is due to the inadequate instruction. Therefore, RTI is a more powerful process to identify whether the students have learning disability. As RTI is a regular education initiative, all three tiers of services are intended to be provided as supplements to, not replacements for, the regular education curriculum; there are some, however, who view Tier 3 as special education.

School-wide screening
The first level of data collected in the RTI process comes from universal school-wide screenings. These screening assessments are typically given to all students within targeted grade levels, and cover basic academic subjects such as reading and mathematics. Most screening measures aim to be practical and efficient to administer, with the goal of identifying students who may require further assessments and interventions.

To evaluate student performance on the screening measures, scores are compared to specific criteria (criterion referenced) or to broad norms (norm referenced). When specific criteria are used, cut scores are established to evaluate students against a specific level of proficiency (e.g., achieving a score of 15 or above); in a normative comparison, students' scores are compared against those of a larger group (e.g., scoring above the 25th percentile compared to a national sample of 3rd grade students).

Screenings usually occur three times per year (fall, winter, and spring), and the data from these assessments help to guide instruction through the three tiers of the RTI process. This is important not only for identifying students who are having difficulties, but also for identifying possible areas of improvement in the general classroom instruction in the cases where too many students fall below expectations. Because a single universal screening at the beginning of the year can over-identify students who require preventive intervention, the National Research Center on Learning Disabilities recommends that schools also integrate at least five weeks of weekly progress monitoring to identify students who require preventive intervention.

Teaching 
Core curriculum in the classroom should be research-based and field tested. This means, based on evidence from congregating research, that the core curriculum contains all the fundamentals found necessary to efficiently teach reading and has a recognized record of achievement. Such curriculum is to be delivered by "highly qualified" teachers adequately trained to deliver the selected instruction as intended, that is, with fidelity to design.

Progress monitoring and tiered service delivery
Progress monitoring is a set of assessment procedures for determining the extent to which students are benefiting from classroom instruction and for monitoring effectiveness of curriculum.

Curriculum-based measurement (CBM) is often used to collect data on interventions and their effectiveness to determine what works best for an individual student. Additional methods are attempted until students "respond" to the intervention and improve their skills. Students that do not respond, or respond at significantly low rates, may be deemed to have biologically based learning disabilities, rather than simply learning difficulties.

Progress monitoring is the scientifically based practice of assessing students' academic performance on a regular basis for three purposes: 
To determine whether children are profiting appropriately from the instructional program, including the curriculum
To build more effective programs for the children who do not benefit
To estimate rates of student improvement

Three tiers of Scientifically Research-Based Interventions (SRBIs) of increasing intensity incorporate the key components of RTI and help ensure the academic growth and achievement of students.

Tier 1
The first tier states that all students receive core classroom instruction that is differentiated and utilizes strategies and materials that are scientifically research-based. Assessment in the classroom should be ongoing and effective in that it clearly identifies the strengths and weaknesses for each learner. Any necessary interventions at this level are within the framework of the general education classroom and can be in the form of differentiated instruction, small group review, or one-on-one remediation of a concept.

Progress monitoring in Tier 1 uses universal screening assessments to show individual student growth over time and to determine whether students are progressing as expected. In this process, data are collected, students are identified using benchmark scores, and measurable goals are set for the next data collection point for those who display difficulties. The team then follows a problem-solving process to determine interventions for at-risk students that will work within whole-class instructions. The classroom teacher implements the interventions, observations are conducted to ensure the fidelity of the classroom instruction, and the problem-solving team periodically reviews the progress of students.

Tier 2
In the second tier, supplemental interventions may occur within or outside of the general education classroom, and progress monitoring occurs at more frequent intervals. Core instruction is still delivered by the classroom teacher, but small groups of similar instructional levels may work together under a teacher's instruction and/or guidance. This type of targeted instruction is typically for 30 minutes per day, two to four days per week, for a minimum of nine weeks. This targeted instruction may occur in the general education setting or outside in a smaller group setting with a specialized teacher (such as a Literacy Support teacher for struggling readers).

In Tier 2, the main purpose of progress monitoring is to determine whether interventions are successful in helping students learn at an appropriate rate. Decision rules are created to determine when a student might no longer require extra interventions, when the interventions need to be changed, or when a student might be identified for special education.

Oral language abilities at the onset of reading intervention programs are an excellent predictor of final outcomes. Both English as a first language and English-language learners demonstrate that the greater the oral language impairment, the greater the associated growth from RTI. Phonics-based RTI programs are most effective prior to grade 1, however, after grade 1 comprehension and mixed RTI programs are associated with greater effect sizes.

Tier 3
Tier three is for students who require more intense, explicit and individualized instruction and have not shown sufficient response to Tier 1 and Tier 2 interventions. This type of targeted instruction is delivered for a minimum of two 30-minute sessions every week for nine to twelve weeks. The interventions in this tier may be similar to those in Tier 2 except that they are intensified in focus, frequency, and duration. The instruction in Tier 3 is typically delivered outside of the general education classroom. Programs, strategies, and procedures are designed and employed to supplement, enhance, and support Tier 1 and Tier 2 instruction by remediation of the relevant area and development of compensatory strategies. If Tier 3 is not successful, a child is considered for the first time as potentially having a learning disability.

In some cases, Tier 3 is considered to be special education, with instruction being provided to individual students or small groups by special education teachers in place of general education instruction (rather than as a supplement). Initial goals are established through an individualized education program (IEP), which is guided by the results of a comprehensive evaluation, and ongoing progress monitoring helps to direct the teaching process. Special education instruction likely will be considerably longer than the 10 to 12 weeks of supplemental instruction delivered in Tier 2 and beyond. The frequency of special education instruction depends upon student need, and the criteria to exit special education are specified and monitored so that placement can be flexible.

RTI implementation
The number of schools implementing RTI continues to grow and 61% of schools surveyed in 2010 indicated that they had fully implemented or were in the process of implementing RTI. However, most schools in the survey indicated that the continued to focus on reading interventions at the elementary school. RTI is primarily implemented by grade-level teams or professional learning communities as part of a school-wide problem-solving plan, and previous research found that implementing RTI resulted in several positive outcomes such as reductions in students referred to and placed into special education, more students passing state accountability tests, and increased academic skills among students at-risk for reading failure.

Fidelity of implementation
In an RTI model, fidelity is important at both the school level (e.g., implementation of the process) and the teacher level (e.g., implementation of instruction). Although the concept of fidelity of implementation is supported by research and is generally viewed as common sense, there are practical challenges associated with achieving high levels of fidelity.
Factors that can reduce fidelity when implementing instruction include:
Complexity of the interventions and the time required to implement them
Inaccessibility of required materials and resources
Low perceptions/expectations of effectiveness (teachers may not fully commit to an intervention if they believe that it will not be effective, or if it is inconsistent with their teaching style)
Low numbers, expertise, and motivation of those who deliver the interventions
Factors that can increase fidelity when implementing an RTI model include:
Well-functioning professional learning communities
Using a universal screener that is brief, aligned with the curriculum, result in reliable data, and is validated for screening decisions
Using a data-management system that is easily accessible by classroom teachers
Implementing interventions that address the skill deficit of students
Identifying and addressing class-wide needs
Establishing well-defined decision rules
Clear leadership from the building principal
Ongoing training and professional development
Key stakeholders working together in a flexible manner to improve student learning
Use of standard-protocol interventions for tier 2
Not making entitlement (i.e., special education disability identification) decisions until the RTI system is in place and well established.

Classification of RTI
RTI is a general education process that is used in schools to ensure students receive the supports they need to be successful and excel in school.  In the educational literature, RTI is often referred to as a Standard Protocol Approach,  as a Problem Solving Model., or as a hybrid of the two. However, some have challenged a dichotomous view of RTI because both models incorporate problem solving to identify the academic or social-emotional difficulty the student is having and both use a systematic, universal screening procedure during Tier 1 to determine which students are having difficulties meeting age or grade level benchmarks for a specific skill. Typically, Curriculum Based Measurement (CBM) or other predictive data are used to flag the students who are not meeting expected levels of performance. In the problem-solving model approach, the teacher typically refers the student to a problem-solving team to ascertain the challenges a student is having within the classroom. Using information collected from the classroom teacher and others, observations, etc., the team determines what additional supports the student might need to address the learning gap. Standard-protocol approaches tend to rely more on grade-level teams and professional learning communities to make intervention decisions, but both approaches use a problem-solving procedure to make decisions, which makes the distinction somewhat meaningless. Many schools rely on grade-level teams to make intervention decision and use a standardized intervention for tier 2, but then rely on a problem-solving team to develop individualized interventions for tier 3.

When a student is identified as having difficulties in school, a team provides interventions of increasing intensity to help the child catch up with the rest of his or her peers. When students continue to struggle, even when appropriate evidence-based practices have been delivered with fidelity, students may be referred for a special education evaluation.  Parents can request a special education evaluation at any time in this process, however.   While the RTI process can be a way to ensure that each student is afforded the opportunity to learn, some opponents feel that it allows school districts to avoid or delay identifying students who need special education services. Proponents would point out that RTI is not the process of identifying students with a learning disability by starting tiered interventions when a disability is suspected, but is the process of examining data that already exist from implementing a tiered intervention model, which should expedite the identification process. The expected outcome of RTI is improved instruction that will result in improved outcomes for all students.

Support for RTI 
There are at least four main reasons for implementing RTI: 1) to increase achievement for all students; 2) to reduce racial/ethnic disproportionate representation of minority students in special education; 3) to increase collaboration and integration of general and special education; 4) and to identify students with learning disabilities through a different lens than the IQ-achievement discrepancy model. RTI proponents claim that when interventions work, fewer children, particularly minority children, are referred for special education, and that the RTI model acts as a safeguard, ensuring that a child is not given a label of a disability inappropriately. In addition, proponents state that RTI  helps school districts by eliminating unnecessary referrals, which drain time and resources. Critics express concern, however, that in attempting to eliminate unnecessary referrals, RTI may also delay or eliminate necessary referrals.

Proponents feel that response to intervention is the best opportunity for giving all students the additional time and support needed to learn at high levels, and see great benefit in that it applies to the classroom teachers, paraeducators, counselors, and the administration. The RTI process can help identify students who are at-risk, guide adjustments to instruction, monitor student progress, and then make other recommendations as necessary. The objective is that with minor adjustments or simple interventions, students may respond and achieve at higher levels.

RTI is also very useful when working with students who have severe emotional problems.  The structure and evaluation of RTI will help this particular group of students to be successful in the academic environment.

Reading difficulties is one of the most common reasons students need intervention support.  Reading goals can develop reading self-concept, which influence reading fluency skills and promotes the importance of goal setting in reading intervention programs. It is imperative that students monitor these goals and celebrate their progress. Students involved in multiple-component reading intervention programs show significant improvement, and students in different socioeconomic, racial, and intellectual quotient groups make equivalent gains.

Relationship between IDEA and RTI 
The 1997 Individuals with Disabilities Education Act (IDEA) was revised as the Individual Disabilities Education Improvement Act (IDEIA) and signed into law in 2004, and it became effective in July 2006. According to the law, a specific learning disability is a disorder of one or more of the basic psychological processes that adversely affects academic achievement in one or more domains (e.g., reading, writing, math, language). There are three methods of SLD identification under IDEA, as defined in §300.8(c)(10) (OSERS Final Regulations-8/06):
a discrepancy between "ability" and "achievement"
failure to respond to scientific research-based  intervention
alternative research-based procedures for determining whether a child has a specific learning disability
(The "third method" is often considered a "processing strengths and weaknesses" model.)

The 2004 reauthorization of IDEA makes mention of RTI as a method of part of the process of identifying SLD: 
In diagnosing learning disabilities, schools are no longer required to use the discrepancy model. The act states that, "a local educational agency shall not be required to take into consideration whether a child has a severe discrepancy between achievement and intellectual ability..."
Response to intervention is specifically mentioned in the regulations in conjunction with the identification of a specific learning disability. IDEA 2004 states, "a local educational agency may use a process that determines if the child responds to scientific, research-based intervention as a part of the evaluation procedures."
Early Intervening Services (EIS) are prominently mentioned in IDEA for the first time. These services are directed at interventions for students prior to referral in an attempt to avoid inappropriate classification, which proponents claim an RTI model does. IDEA now authorizes the use of up to 15% of IDEA allocated funds for EIS.

RTI was included in the regulations due to considerable concerns raised by both the House and Senate Committees regarding proponents of RTI claims about the use of IQ tests to identify learning disabled students. There was also recognition in these committees of a growing body of scientific research supporting methods of pre-referral interventions that resolved learning difficulties short of classification. However, the final regulations also allow a third method of SLD identification, often considered a processing strengths and weaknesses model.

The IDEA Committee Conference Report (CCR) discusses the use of scientifically based early intervention programs, describes a model response-to-intervention program, and recommends the development of the most effective implementation of responsiveness to intervention models. The report describes such a model as an essential service for reducing the need to label children as disabled.

Through the establishment of the RTI process in IDEIA, schools could shift from a model that required teachers to wait for students to fail, to a model of prevention, offering extra support to students during the learning process.

Evaluating SLD using RTI

First, whatever procedures are used to evaluate students as eligible for special education in the category of specific learning disabilities (SLD) must conform to the requirements of the IDEA regulations (2006), which indicate that a full and individual evaluation of a student suspected as having an SLD must address four qualifications. First, the evaluation must document that "...the child does not achieve adequately for the child's age or to meet State-approved grade-level standards in one or more of the following areas, when provided with learning experiences and instruction appropriate for the child's age or state-approved grade-level standards: oral expression, listening comprehension, written expression, basic reading skill, reading fluency skills, reading comprehension, mathematics calculation, mathematics problem-solving" (§300.309[a][1]). Second, the evaluation must document that "...(t)he child does not make sufficient progress to meet age or State-approved grade-level standards in one or more of the areas identified ...when using a process based on the child's response to scientific, research-based intervention; or (t)he child exhibits a pattern of strengths and weaknesses in performance, achievement, or both, relative to age, State-approved grade-level standards, or intellectual development, that is determined by the group to be relevant to the identification of a specific learning disability, using appropriate assessments (§300.309[a][2). Third, the evaluation must establish that the child's academic deficiencies are not the results of "...visual, hearing, or motor disabilities; intellectual disability; emotional disturbance; cultural factors; environmental or economic disadvantage; or Limited English proficiency" (§300.309[a][3]) or of a lack of instruction ((§300.309[a][4]). Notably, a child must demonstrate qualifications under all four of these criteria to be identified with an SLD.

Kovaleski, VanDerHeyden and Shapiro (2013) used these IDEA regulations to operationalize how evaluation teams could utilize data collected during the provision of a multi-tier system of support in the evaluation process, particularly those data that inform the second SLD criterion of the child's failure to make sufficient progress in response scientific, research-based intervention (namely, RTI). Although evaluation teams may collect additional data after parents give permission for a full and individual evaluation, there should be ample data collected during three tiers of core instruction and robust intervention that can be analyzed to address all four of the SLD criteria.

In regard to the first SLD criterion, students undergoing multiple tiers of support have typically undergone multiple assessments of their academic skills, including annual state tests, universal screenings of all students that schools typically conduct three times per year, and academic assessments by specialists who deliver increasingly intense academic interventions. To qualify under this first criterion, the preponderance of these data should indicate a significant academic deficiency in at least one of the identified areas.

When using RTI as a component of eligibility decision-making, the school entity (school district, state) establishes a policy that identifies the option of using RTI to address the second SLD criterion (and opts not to select the option to use an assessment of the student's pattern of strengths and weaknesses).  The determination that the student fails to make sufficient progress toward age or grade standards is based on an analysis of the progress-monitoring data that are collected during the provision of intensive intervention, typically at tiers 2 and 3 of a multi-tier system of support. These data consist of the results of short assessments of key academic indicators that are administered as often as once or twice weekly. These data are graphed and rates of improvement calculated so that school teams can determine whether their interventions are working. These data are then compared to the rates of improvement made by typically performing students to determine whether the interventions that are being implemented in general education are sufficient to allow the student to reach grade standards. If not, a need for special education is indicated, and the student meets the second qualification for SLD.

The process for ruling out other disabilities or conditions when using RTI is similar to that employed in other special education evaluations, and consists of procedures to ensure that sensory or intellectual disabilities or environmental disadvantage or cultural/linguistic differences are not the true cause of the student's assessed academic deficiencies. Establishing that the student's deficiencies are not the result of a lack of instruction, however, requires that the evaluation team document that the school has sufficiently provided good core instruction in the basic skills and robust interventions when students have failed to profit from typical instructional practices. The evaluation team must also show evidence that the school personnel conducted repeated assessments of the student's academic problems and communicated the results of those assessments to the student's parents. Schools that use a multi-tier system of support at a high degree of fidelity can typically readily rule out lack of instruction as a cause of the student's academic concerns. On the other hand, in enacting this provision, Congress was demonstrating a concern that students might be identified with a disability (SLD) when the actual cause of their academic failure was ineffective schooling. Identifying students with SLD in failing schools is arguably problematic.

Response to RTI
Criticisms point to delays in identifying students needing special education (which was also a concern in a 2010 OSERS Memorandum), difficulties in accurately determining the presence of a learning disability, and the amount of training needed by general education teachers. RTI can require additional work for teachers, and a potentially significant change in expectations represents a great source of resistance toward RTI.

Another criticism of RTI is that while its core assumptions include "that the educational system can effectively teach all children," interpretations of the approach often do not account for gifted education. An inverted pyramid showing analogous increasing interventions for gifted children could be added to the model so that all children are addressed. A framework for such an approach has been developed by the Montana Office of Public Instruction.

Concerns and criticisms of RTI for SLD classification
Criticisms of the RTI model first surfaced in 2004 when IDEA identified it as a viable method for use in SLD eligibility determination Some feel that RTI is valuable for prevention, but see little empirical support for using RTI to determine learning disabilities, and have concern that it could be used to delay or deny services to children with learning disabilities. Some also argue that there are many unanswered questions about RTI implementation, and that proponents have tended to gloss over or ignore criticisms of the RTI approach. Several major research efforts have supported these contentions through findings suggesting that RTI does not produce reliable sets of responders and non-responders. If RTI does not produce reliable sets of responders/nonresponders, it would be difficult to use this approach to determine learning disabilities.

Technology application to RTI
Technology is becoming increasingly important in improving instructional practices and student achievement. Tools that educators can utilize within their classrooms include weblogs, wikis, RSS aggregators, social bookmarking, online photo galleries, audio/visual casting, Twitter, and social networking sites. Many of these tools can be used for team-based learning and in facilitating students' use of higher forms of thinking such as analysis, evaluation, and synthesis.

Properly integrated technology can increase student learning in areas such as motivation, collaborative learning, critical thinking, and problem solving. Some techniques that have been found to work in education include: identifying similarities and differences; summarizing and note taking; reinforcing effort and providing recognition; assigning homework and practice; utilizing graphic representations of concepts; cooperative learning; providing objectives and feedback; generating and testing hypotheses; providing cues and questions; and using advanced organizers. Technology-rich environments can also be effective for at-risk students, and can motivate students to stay in school and hopefully lessen the achievement gap.

Computer Assisted Instruction (CAI), has been studied for its effects on lower achieving students. The effectiveness has been attributed to it being non-judgmental and motivational, while giving immediate and frequent feedback, individualizing learning to meet the students' needs, allowing for more student autonomy, and providing multi-sensory components. A review of 17 different studies found that CAI positively affected scores in mathematics and literacy for all grade levels and significantly improving scores for students labeled "at-risk".

Technology can also effectively help teach basic literacy skills such as phonemic awareness, alphabetic principle, word recognition, alliteration, and comprehension. Today the use of specialized educational software applications can help support and enhance students' literacy skills. Presentation software such as PowerPoint can be used to enhance young children learning experience. The use of pictures, colors, sounds, animation, slide designs, or slide transitions can be easily implemented into a literacy lesson, and such software has been used, for example, to help students with autism learn and respond to activity schedules.

For young learners, the use of animation directs their attention to important features and prompts them to help ensure correct responses. Teachers can create literacy lessons with attention-grabbing elements such as moving graphic images. For example, a teacher might focus on the initial /d/ sound in the word "dog" as an instructional goal; a presentation slide for this would show a picture of a dog, and the teacher would select three possible letters to represent the initial sound in dog, such as /b/, /c/, and /d/. After showing the picture of the dog, and then displaying each of the three letter choices one-by-one, the teacher would ask the student what letter he or she thinks "dog" starts with. Other types of presentation software for literacy instruction, such as Photo Story, can allow teachers to add a variety of special effects, soundtracks, captions, and their own voice narration to the photo stories.

See also
School Psychology
Minimally invasive education
 Positive education
 Positive Behavior Interventions and Supports

Notes

General references

 
 
 
 
 
 
 
 
 
 National Center for Education Evaluation (2009). "Assisting Students Struggling with Mathematics: Response to Intervention (RtI) for Elementary and Middle Schools".

Further reading
 
 
 
 
 
 
 
 
 
 

Special education
Educational assessment and evaluation
Education policy